Carlos Rojas (born 1970 in Atlanta, Georgia) is an American sinologist and translator. He is currently Professor of Asian and Middle Eastern Studies at Duke University's Trinity College of Arts & Sciences. He is a cultural historian and his work and teachings primarily focus on Chinese culture. He also teaches the subjects of film, gender, sexuality, and feminist studies. He received a B.A. from Cornell University in 1995 and a Ph.D. from Columbia University in 2000. Before his professorship at Duke, Rojas was Assistant Professor of Modern Chinese Literature and Film at the University of Florida. Rojas lives in Durham, North Carolina.

Career
Carlos Rojas and Eileen Cheng-yin Chow translated Yu Hua's novel Brothers. Their translation was shortlisted for the 2008 Man Asian Literary Prize. Rojas has also translated several books by Chinese novelist and short story writer Yan Lianke. His translation of Yan Lianke's The Four Books was shortlisted for the 2016 Man Booker International Prize. Isabel Hilton of The Observer called it "impeccably" translated. His translation of Yan Lianke's The Explosion Chronicles was longlisted for the 2017 Man Booker International Prize, the 2017 Pen Translation Prize, and the 2017 National Translation Award in Prose. The Economist praised Rojas' "robust and well-paced translation." The Guardian called his translation a "model of clarity."

Rojas served on the jury of the 2015 Newman Prize for Chinese Literature and the 2020 Dream of the Red Chamber Award.

In 2010, Rojas published The Great Wall: A Cultural History through Harvard University Press. The book is a survey of the Great Wall of China and its function and significance. In it, Rojas examines allusions to the Wall from various historical texts and cultural works.

Selected bibliography

Books

Translations

As editor

Academic articles

References

1970 births
Living people
21st-century American translators
American non-fiction writers
American sinologists
Chinese–English translators
Historians of China
Literary translators
Cornell University alumni
Columbia University alumni
Duke University faculty
University of Florida faculty
Cultural historians
People from Atlanta
People from Durham, North Carolina